The Welch Miners were a Minor League Baseball team based in Welch, West Virginia. The team operated from 1937 through 1942 in the Mountain State League and in the Appalachian League from 1946 to 1955.

Over the course of nineteen seasons, the Welch Miners were affiliated with the Boston Braves (1942, 1952), Philadelphia Athletics (1947–1950, 1953–1955), and Cincinnati Reds (1951).

The team won consecutive league titles in 1952 and 1953, and moved to Marion, Virginia, during the 1955 season, changing their name to the Marion Athletics.

Notable alumni

 Vern Bickford (1939–1942) MLB All-Star
 Dave Bristol (1951)
 Max Butcher (1946)
 Sam Gray (1939)

Team history

Sources
BR - Appalachian League
BR - Mountain State League

Defunct minor league baseball teams
Defunct Appalachian League teams
Defunct baseball teams in West Virginia
Professional baseball teams in West Virginia
Boston Braves minor league affiliates
Philadelphia Athletics minor league affiliates
Cincinnati Reds minor league affiliates
1937 establishments in West Virginia
1955 disestablishments in West Virginia
Mountain State League teams
Baseball teams established in 1937
Baseball teams disestablished in 1955